Mahendra Mewati (25 January, 1970 – 9 January, 2019) was an Indian theatre and film actor known for his theatre productions. and for films. He has also directed the play Oedipus Rex (written by Sophocles).

Early life
Mahendra Mewati was born in Sagar, Madhya Pradesh, to a Hindu family. He did school education from Ambikapur and then graduated from Sagar University. During this time, Ashutosh Rana was his senior and influenced by him, Mahendra chose the path of acting, and passed the NSD examination and enrolled in acting studies.

In 1992, he earned a scholarship to study at National School of Drama (NSD) in New Delhi.

Death 
Mahendra Mewati was found dead in his Versova Mumbai residence on 9 January 2019 night. In the morning when the actors reached the rehearsals of the play, then Mahendra Mewati had a blood clot, and was found dead, cause of the death has not been revealed.

Filmography 

Stage Roles with NSD Repertory:

Theatre plays

References

External links 
 Mahendra Mewati on IMDB

1970 births
2019 deaths
Indian male stage actors
Male actors from Madhya Pradesh
21st-century Indian male actors
Indian drama teachers
Male actors in Hindi cinema
National School of Drama alumni